The 2nd Grodno Battalion of the King and Commonwealth was a military unit of the Grand Duchy of Lithuania.

History 
This infantry battalion was absorbed into the 7th Lithuanian Infantry Regiment in 1790.

Commanders

Bibliography

Citations

References 

 
 

Grand Duchy of Lithuania